"Live Forever" is a song recorded by American country music group The Band Perry. It was released on August 14, 2015, by Republic Nashville as the purported lead single off their unreleased third studio album, Heart + Beat. "Live Forever" was the last single released by the band on the Big Machine Label Group before parting ways with the company in March 2016.

Background
The song was written by Kimberly Perry, Reid Perry, Neil Perry, Jenna Andrews, Nadir Khayat, Jakke Erixson, Karl-Ola Kjellholm, and produced by Dann Huff and RedOne. It was first announced in the weekly Billboard Country Update on August 3, 2015 and was released on August 14, 2015.

Critical reception
Country music blog Taste of Country reviewed the song positively, complimenting the anthemic nature of the song as well as its "big", "vivid" sound. In a starred review for Digital Journal, Markos Papadatos praised the trio for trying something new and noted the singles is "good regardless" of their shift in genre; he rated the song four stars out of five. Grady Smith of The Guardian was more critical, writing that the song "pushes the band away from the hearty style that made them great in the first place," and insisting that "Live Forever" is "not a country song – it's a bad pop song."

Music video
The video for "Live Forever" premiered on CMT on August 15, 2015. It was filmed in La Vergne, Tennessee and directed by Colin Tilley.

In popular culture
The song was chosen by Team USA to be their official song for the 2016 Summer Olympics.

Live performances
The Band Perry premiered the song live on Good Morning America on August 14, 2015, and on the Today Show on April 27, 2016. The song was also performed at the Miss Universe 2015 competition.

Track listing
Digital download

"Live Forever" – 3:52

Chart performance

Release history

References

2015 singles
2015 songs
The Band Perry songs
Republic Nashville singles
Song recordings produced by RedOne
Song recordings produced by Dann Huff
Songs written by RedOne
Republic Records singles
Music videos directed by Colin Tilley
Songs written by Jakke Erixson
Songs written by Jenna Andrews